Gurmeet Singh (14 November 1987 - 2 February 2022) popularly known as Bunty Singh was an actor, dancer, choreographer and cinematographer who mostly worked in Nagpuri  and Khortha albums and films. He was born in  Jamshedpur. He also participated in dance reality show Boogie Woogie. He had prominent role in establishing distinct identity of Nagpuri album and films.

Early life
He was born on 14 November 1987 in Jamshedpur to Mahendra Singh and Satnam Kaur. His original name was Gurmeet Singh. His family are from Punjab. He had two brothers and two sisters. One of his brothers' names is Sunny Singh. He married Sonal and has one son Jacks.

Career
He had dance institute Jhanjhar near Plaza Chowk.
He participated in dance reality show Boogie Woogie. Then he worked in many Nagpuri and Khortha albums. He was actor, dancer and choreographer. He had studio in Kanke, Bunty Studio. His first Nagpuri album was Mandar Bajela. He was choreographer in Nagpuri film Chingari. He also worked in Nagpuri film Pyar Kar Sapna (2005). He had prominent role in establishing distinct identity of Nagpuri songs and films.

Filmography

Series

Death
He had high blood pressure and was taking medicine daily. On 1 February 2022, he became ill and was admitted in Guru Nanak Hospital, Ranchi. On 2 February he died due to a brain hemorrhage.

References

External links

1987 births
2022 deaths
People from Jamshedpur
21st-century Indian male actors
Male actors from Jharkhand
Indian male film actors
Indian male television actors